The Waranga Dam is a major earthfill embankment dam with an uncontrolled spillway located approximately  north of Melbourne in the North Central region of the Australian state of Victoria.

The area now covered by the Waranga Basin includes a swamp that was known as Warranga (an indigenous word) or Gunn's after William Gunn, one of the early pastoralists who established his squatting run, also called Waranga, in the area surrounding the swamp. William Gunn was a Braehour Gunn who emigrated to Victoria in 1853 from Wick, Scotland. His half-brother was the Honourable Donald Gunn of Manitoba, Canada. Gold was discovered near Waranga Swamp in 1853, making it one of Victoria's oldest goldfields.

Construction
Construction of the earth dam began in 1905 and was completed in 1915 using picks, shovels and horse-drawn scoops. The site of the basin was a former swamp in the then Waranga Shire. Construction of the dam was commissioned by the State Rivers and Water Supply Commission of Victoria for the irrigation of the Western Goulburn Valley.

Between 1915 and 1926, the embankment was raised in stages and a core wall was inserted. The major road between Tatura and Rushworth crosses the outlet.

Distribution of the water
Waranga Basin stores water flowing downstream from Lake Eildon as well as having a catchment area of its own. Waranga Basin supplies water to the Central Goulburn Irrigation Area and Rochester Irrigation Area. However, the Waranga Western Channel takes some of the water  to Pyramid Hill and Boort. Goulburn–Murray Water is responsible for regulating the flow of water from the basin.

Normally, only about three-quarters of the  can be used in irrigation. However, in 2002-03, an additional  was supplied through pumping to assist farmers in the Goulburn Irrigation System experiencing severe drought.

See also

 Irrigation in Australia
 List of reservoirs and dams in Victoria

References

External links
 Goulburn Murray Water page on Waranga Basin
 Waranga Basin Pumping

Reservoirs in Victoria (Australia)
Dams in Victoria (Australia)
Goulburn Broken catchment
Rivers of Hume (region)
Goulburn River
Irrigation in Australia
Dams completed in 1915
Embankment dams
North Central Victoria